Kristián Mihálek (born 10 March 2000) is a Slovak footballer who currently plays for Skalica, in Fortuna Liga as a right back.

Club career

Spartak Trnava
Mihálek made his Fortuna Liga debut for Spartak Trnava against Nitra at pod Zoborom on 18 May 2019. Mihálek was featured in the starting line-up and played the entire game, which Trnava won after a second-half goal by David Depetris.

Loan to Pohronie
Mihálek had joined Pohronie in February 2020 on a half-season agreement. He failed to make an appearance in the club as he returned from the loan.

References

External links
 FC Spartak Trnava official profile
 Futbalnet profile 
 
 

2000 births
Living people
Footballers from Bratislava
Slovak footballers
Slovakia youth international footballers
Slovakia under-21 international footballers
Association football midfielders
FC Spartak Trnava players
FK Pohronie players
FC Petržalka players
MFK Skalica players
Slovak Super Liga players
2. Liga (Slovakia) players